Batrachedra nuciferae is a moth in the family Batrachedridae. It is found in Brazil. The larvae have been recorded feeding on Attalea, Cocos nucifera, and Syagrus coronae.

References

Natural History Museum Lepidoptera generic names catalog

Batrachedridae
Moths described in 1966